is a Japanese chef, specializing in Italian cuisine. He was a top chef in Japan until, in a 1991 car accident, he killed two people and injured several others. The accident propelled him into financial ruin and disgrace. Out of the limelight, he worked in relative obscurity for several years. In 1998, he began a public comeback on an episode of the popular Japanese cooking show, Iron Chef, where he won the Cabbage Battle against Iron Chef Chinese Chen Kenichi.

References 

1953 births
Living people
Japanese chefs
Chefs of Italian cuisine
People from Taitō